St Wilfrid's Catholic School is a voluntary aided comprehensive Catholic secondary school in Crawley, West Sussex, England for pupils aged 11 to 18. It caters for 936 pupils in years 7 to 13, including 181 in its sixth form.

History
St Wilfrid's Roman Catholic (Aided) modern school opened in 1953 on its current campus in Crawley New Town to provide Catholic secondary education for the children of the town. At first, based in an old manor house, additional buildings were developed over the next ten years to accommodate increasing numbers. In 1967, the school became comprehensive.

Further increases in numbers on roll led to changes in 1970 which saw the school change to become an upper school providing education for pupils aged 13 to 18, with younger pupils attending one of the two newly opened middle schools in the town: Holy Cross Intermediate School and Notre Dame Intermediate School. This arrangement continued until 1996, when falling rolls led to a return to the school becoming a full secondary accepting pupils aged 11+.

From 2007, preparations went underway for a complete re-build of the school on its existing campus which opened in 2008.

Campus

The campus for the school was originally based around the school building, named "Oakwood" which lies alongside Goffs Park. The residence was purchased by the diocese in 1952 to provide a Catholic secondary school in the new town. It was accompanied by 21 ac (8.5 ha) of land that makes up the modern campus.
The school moved into its new home in May 2009. It still maintains the same address as before, but, besides that, the building is different. The new school premises provide facilities set within a building. The facilities include a Sports England standard sports hall and external pitches, a drama studio; multi-use activity space for drama, dance and physical education; a range of laboratories and workshops; a music suite and art gallery; together with a Learning Resource Centre and ICT facilities throughout the school. The new facilities also enable the school to offer its local community an Enterprise and Learning Centre and a chapel in which school and parish can gather in worship.

Students
The school is comprehensive, providing education for around 900 pupils aged between 11 and 18 of all abilities. It sets its own admissions criteria in line with other voluntary aided schools. It provides education for pupils from Crawley, and the nearby towns of Horsham and East Grinstead and their surrounding villages.

The A Level results this year (2010) were reported as the highest results in the school's history with Year 13 students attaining a 99% pass rate, which is above the national average, with 15% achieving A*-A grade, 40% achieving an A*-B grade and 70% achieving A*-C.

Notable alumni
The school is noted for its musical alumni: Robert Smith  (of The Cure), Paul Stewart, Kevin Jeremiah and Ciaran Jeremiah (all of The Feeling) and Jeremy Cunningham (of The Levellers (band)).

Actor Timothy Innes, who stars as King Edward in the Netflix television series The Last Kingdom
is also a past student.

References

External links
 School website

Buildings and structures in Crawley
Educational institutions established in 1953
Secondary Schools in Crawley
Secondary schools in West Sussex
Catholic secondary schools in the Diocese of Arundel and Brighton
1953 establishments in England
Voluntary aided schools in England